Calycopeplus paucifolius is an erect shrub species in the family Euphorbiaceae. It is found in South Australia & Western Australia.

Calycopeplus paucifolius is a broom-like shrub, growing from 60 cm to 5 m high. Its flowers are green-white, and seen from September to December on hillslopes and granite outcrops, growing on stony loams, sands and sandy clays.

The species was first described as Euphorbia paucifolia in 1845 by Johann Friedrich Klotzsch, but was transferred to the genus, Calycopeplus, by Henri Ernest Baillon in 1866.

References

External links

Calycopeplus paucifolius occurrence data from Australasian Virtual Herbarium

Euphorbieae
Flora of Western Australia
Taxa named by Henri Ernest Baillon
Plants described in 1845